The 2022–23 Notre Dame Fighting Irish men's ice hockey season will be the 63rd season of play for the program. They will represent the University of Notre Dame in the 2022–23 NCAA Division I men's ice hockey season and for the 6th season in the Big Ten Conference. The Fighting Irish will be coached by Jeff Jackson, in his 17th season, and play their home games at Compton Family Ice Arena.

Season

Departures

Recruiting

Roster
As of August 25, 2022.

Standings

Schedule and results

|-
!colspan=12 style=";" | Exhibition

|-
!colspan=12 style=";" | 

|-
!colspan=12 style=";" | Regular Season

|-
!colspan=12 style=";" |

Scoring statistics

Goaltending statistics

Rankings

USCHO did not release a poll in weeks 1 and 13.

References

External links

2022–23
Notre Dame Fighting Irish
Notre Dame Fighting Irish
Notre Dame Fighting Irish
Notre Dame Fighting Irish